Aboudeïa can mean:

Aboudeïa, a city in Chad
Aboudeïa, a department of Chad